Tierra de Mérida - Vegas Bajas is a comarca in the province of Badajoz, Extremadura, Spain. It contains the following municipalities:

 Alange
 Aljucén
 Arroyo de San Serván
 Calamonte
 Carmonita
 Cordobilla de Lácara
 Don Álvaro
 El Carrascalejo
 Esparragalejo
 Guadiana del Caudillo
 La Garrovilla
 La Nava de Santiago
 La Roca de la Sierra
 La Zarza
 Lobón
 Mérida
 Mirandilla
 Montijo
 Oliva de Mérida
 Puebla de la Calzada
 Puebla de Obando
 San Pedro de Mérida
 Torremayor
 Trujillanos
 Valdelacalzada
 Valverde de Mérida
 Villagonzalo

References 

Comarcas of Extremadura
Province of Badajoz